The cycling competition at the 1952 Summer Olympics consisted of two road cycling events and four track cycling events, all for men only. 215 cyclists from 36 countries competed in the six events.

Medal summary

Road cycling

Track cycling

Participating nations
215 cyclists from 36 nations competed.

Medal table

References

External links
Official Olympic Report

 
1952 Summer Olympics events
1952
1952 in road cycling
1952 in track cycling
1952 in cycle racing